Jessy Greene is a violinist, cellist and vocalist from St. Paul, Minnesota. She was a former member of Geraldine Fibbers and The Jayhawks.

Career
A native of Sheffield in  western Massachusetts, Jessy started playing the violin at the age of four. During high school she took a break from the instrument to play guitar in a rock band before deciding to play violin in more contemporary styles. 

Later, she got a degree from the UCLA in ethnomusicology, and joined the Peter Himmelman "Skin" tour, playing violin and singing backup. Upon returning to Los Angeles, Jessy joined the Geraldine Fibbers, with whom she recorded two albums. In 1997 she moved to Minneapolis, joining The Jayhawks. In Minnesota, Greene played with local projects and recorded two solo albums.

Jessy has played with a number of artists including Golden Smog, Wilco, RZA, Post Malone,  JoAnna James, Atmosphere, Joseph Arthur, Soul Asylum and Dessa. Two of the most prominent are the Foo Fighters, which Greene was introduced through keyboardist Rami Jaffee and went on to take part in one tour and songs in two albums, Wasting Light and  Concrete and Gold; and Pink, whom she first joined as part of a 10-piece string section on American Music Awards in 2008, and went on to appear in all of Pink's tours starting with the Funhouse Tour in 2009. Greene played at Hardly Strictly Bluegrass Festival as part of Exene's band the California Mothership in 2010, and also recorded and toured with Ben Harper, Joseph Arthur and Dhani Harrison in their band Fistful of Mercy.

Her song "Time Bomb" was featured at the end of the Burn Notice season 2 finale called "Lesser Evil".

Discography

Albums
Blue Sky (2002)
A Demon & Her Lovers (2006)

Guest appearances
 Wilco - "The Lonely 1" from Being There (1996)
 Wilco - "Jesus, Etc." from Yankee Hotel Foxtrot (2002)
 Dosh - "Song for Zelbert Moore" from Dosh (2002)
 Dessa - "Mineshaft" from False Hopes (2005)
 Atmosphere - "Little Man" from You Can't Imagine How Much Fun We're Having (2005)
 Dessa - "Mineshaft II" from A Badly Broken Code (2010)
 Foo Fighters - Wasting Light (2011)
 Ben Harper - By My Side (2012)
 Sound City - Real to Reel (2013)
 Joseph Arthur - The Ballad of Boogie Christ (2013)
 Ghost - "If You Have Ghosts" from If You Have Ghost (2013)
 Dessa - The Hamilton Mixtape  (2016)
 Foo Fighters - Concrete and Gold'' (2017)

References

External links
 Official website
 Jessy Greene on Discogs

American rock violinists
Living people
The Minus 5 members
Tuatara (band) members
People from Sheffield, Massachusetts
UCLA School of the Arts and Architecture alumni
21st-century violinists
1970 births